The Graduate School of Public and International Affairs (GSPIA) is one of 17 schools comprising the University of Pittsburgh. Founded in 1957 to study national and international public administration, GSPIA prides itself on its "Local to Global" distinction. As of 2018, it is one of only two policy schools with programs in the top 20 for both International Relations (Foreign Policy, 2015) and City Management and Urban Policy (U.S. News & World Report, 2018). The former mayor of Pittsburgh, Bill Peduto, is a GSPIA alumnus.

GSPIA is accredited by the Network of Schools of Public Policy, Affairs, and Administration (NASPAA), and is a member of the Association of Professional Schools of International Affairs (APSIA). The school is located in Wesley W. Posvar Hall on the University of Pittsburgh campus in the Oakland neighborhood of Pittsburgh. In July 2007, John T. S. Keeler took over as dean, replacing Carolyn Ban, who resigned in August 2006.

History

In 1957, GSPIA was founded by Donald C. Stone in an effort to promote the study of national and international public administration, and to recognize the growing significance of public policy in the global context, and was soon after noted for its breadth and scope.  Stone's philosophy included promoting the notion of "citizenship" and encouraged his colleagues, students, and friends to make government better, to make administrations more effective, and to provide responsible leadership and stewardship for future generations. Stone's  public service career included developing procedures for the Civil Works Administration and planning and implementing the Works Progress Administration. He helped draft the United Nations Charter and his efforts were instrumental in the success of the Marshall Plan in rebuilding Europe after the Second World War.

Demographics
GSPIA employs over 33 full-time, 70 adjunct faculty members, 32 staff members, and has an 11:1 student/faculty ratio. Currently, there are over 8,000 GSPIA alumni working in more than 100 countries around the globe, 1,400 of which are in the Greater Pittsburgh Area.
Entering Class Bio-Demographics (Fall 2017):
400 total students 
69% full-time, 31% part-time
61% female, 39% male
41% out-of-state, 59% in-state (Pennsylvania)
15% U.S. minority
20% international, representing the countries of Argentina, Australia, China, Colombia, Brazil, Ghana, Guatemala, Guinea, India, Indonesia, Japan, Kenya, Kyrgyzstan, Mexico, Morocco, Nigeria, Nicaragua, Oman, Pakistan, Peru, South Korea, Vietnam, and others.

Academics
GSPIA offers several degree and certificate programs.

Degree programs
GSPIA offers several graduate degrees relative to public affairs. Full-time students can complete most master's degree programs within 16 months of study, however, programs can be completed on part-time basis. The MPPM degree is designed for mid-career professionals, and can usually be completed in one year of full-time study. The following is a list of degrees and focuses currently available through GSPIA.
MPA - Master of Public Administration
Public and Nonprofit Management
Urban Affairs and Planning
Policy Research and Analysis
Energy and Environment
Governance and International Public Management
MPIA - Master of Public & International Affairs
Security and Intelligence Studies
Human Security
International Political Economy
MID - Master of International Development
Nongovernmental Organizations and Civil Society
Urban Affairs and Planning
Human Security
Energy and Environment
Governance and International Public Management
MPPM - Master of Public Policy & Management (Mid-Career)
Individualized

PhD - Doctor of Philosophy
International Development (ID)
International Affairs (IA)
Public Administration (PA)
Public Policy & Management (PPM)

GSPIA has recently added the Peace Corps Master's International (MI) track that enables students to earn a master's degree in public health and also volunteer with the Peace Corps. This program blends classroom learning with real-world experience for students interested in a career in global health.

Additionally, GSPIA offers several joint degree programs with other schools within the University of Pittsburgh, as well as with universities within the Pittsburgh Council on Higher Education. The following are a list of available joint degree programs available to students at GSPIA.
MPA, MPIA, or MID & Master of Public Health (MPH)
MPIA or MID & Master of Business Administration (MBA)
MPA, MPIA, or MID & Master of Science in Information Science (MSIS)
MPA, MPIA, or MID & Juris Doctor (JD)
MPA, MPIA, or MID & Master of Social Work (MSW)

Certificate programs

Certificates from the University Center for International Studies (UCIS) can usually be obtained without requiring additional credit hours, and demonstrate a focus in a particular field of study. The University Center for International Studies at the University of Pittsburgh is home to four internationally recognized area studies centers. Each one has been designated a National Resource Center by the United States Department of Education, certifying their status as leading centers of their kind in the United States. The University Center for International Studies offers Area Studies certificates in the following areas:
African Studies
Asian Studies
European Union Studies
Latin American Studies
West European Studies
East European Studies
Russian Studies

In a joint partnership between GSPIA and UCIS, students can also obtain a certificate in Global Studies. A certificate in Global Studies provides students with 'global competence.'  Global Studies certificate students choose one of the following six global issues concentrations and unite it with the study of a particular region and language:
Changing Identities in a Global World
Communication, Technology, and Society
Conflict and Conflict Resolution
Global Health
Global Economy and Global Governance
Sustainable Development

Rankings

 #2 in the number of NASPAA dissertation awards won by its doctoral students
 #4 top school for faculty scholarly productivity in the field of International Affairs and Development, (The Chronicle of Higher Education, 2007)
 #6 most innovative public service schools, (Best Value Schools, 2015)
 #19 worldwide for International Relations programs; #16 among US programs and #3 among public US universities (Foreign Policy, 2015)
 #38 nationally for Public Policy (U.S. News & World Report, 2020)
 #7 nationally for International Global Policy and Administration  (U.S. News & World Report, 2020)
 #18 nationally for Urban Policy (U.S. News & World Report, 2020)

GSPIA is one of only two schools to have two National Academy of Public Administration fellows elected in one year (William Dunn and Dean John Keeler). It is also one of nine schools to have produced at least two Network of Schools of Public Policy, Affairs, and Administration presidents.

Research centers & institutes

The Graduate School of Public & International Affairs is home to several research institutes and centers.

The Ford Institute for Human Security  was established at the University of Pittsburgh as a result of an  endowment gift from  Ford Motor Company.  The mission of the Institute is to conduct research that focuses on transnational threats to the human rights of civilian populations, The Institute's function is to generate independent research, disseminate policy papers, and advocate nonpartisan policy proposals to domestic and international policymakers.
The Matthew B. Ridgway Center for International Security Studies is dedicated to educating the next generation of security analysts and to producing scholarship and impartial analysis that informs the options available to policymakers dealing with international and human security on a global scale.  The Ridgway research program  analyzes the security dynamics of the 21st century global environment, concentrating on rapidly evolving and emerging threats.
The Center for Metropolitan Studies connects the academic programs at GSPIA with state and local governments, federal agencies, regional governance institutions, and nonprofit organizations in the United States to address real time problems they are confronting. The Center for Metropolitan Studies houses CONNECT, an organization that promotes cooperation and collaboration between the City of Pittsburgh and the municipalities that comprise Pittsburgh's urban core.
The Johnson Institute for Responsible Leadership provides students, faculty and the community at large with opportunities to engage in disciplined reflections and rigorous inquiry on issues of ethics and accountability that are of particular interest to the public and nonprofit sectors.
Center for Disaster Management provides a school-wide locus to support research, education, and training projects that focus on extreme events. Its goal  is to develop a coherent approach for research and analysis on policy issues related to disaster risk reduction and management that cross interorganizational, interdisciplinary, and interjurisdictional boundaries.

Special programs

 The Philanthropy Forum provides a university-based platform for national dialogue with thinkers and practitioners in the field of philanthropy and engages in research on the history and contemporary contributions of philanthropy to local, national, and global communities.
 The Roscoe Robinson Jr. Memorial Lecture Series promotes discussion and understanding of key issues related to diversity in public service. The series features annual lectures in honor of the late Roscoe Robinson Jr., the first African American U.S. Army four-star general who earned his degree at GSPIA in 1964.
The International Political Economy Colloquium  provides a forum for IPE scholars to present their works in progress.
The Symposium on Political Violence is a joint undertaking co-sponsored with the Department of Political Science, and the Ridgway Center. The Symposium provides a forum both for external scholars and for faculty and graduate students in GSPIA and the Department of Political Science at Pitt to present their research on political violence.

GSPIA student organizations
GSPIA Student Cabinet
Purposeful Penny - a student charity organization benefiting Bright Kids Uganda and Urban Impact
NABU - represents the interests of the PhD student community
AGORA - Professional & Academic Development
EU and the World
Pitt Political Review (GSPIA issue)
International Student Initiative - bridges the gap between international and domestic students at GSPIA with social and professional events.
RIGHT HERE: A Forum for Volunteer Activities
GSPIA Public Speaking Group
Out in Policy - GSPIA student society for LGBT rights

References

External links
Graduate School of Public & International Affairs (GSPIA)
Ford Institute for Human Security
Matthew B. Ridgway Center for International Security
University Center for International Studies
Global Studies Program
Asian Studies Center
Center for Latin American Studies
Center for Russian & Eastern European Studies
European Studies Center

University of Pittsburgh
Public administration schools in the United States
Schools of international relations in the United States
Public policy schools
Universities and colleges in Pittsburgh
1957 establishments in Pennsylvania